Aurelia Dobre (born 16 November 1972) is a former artistic gymnast and the 1987 world all-around champion. She is the 1987 world champion on the balance beam and the bronze medalist on the vault and floor exercise, as well, and scored five perfect 10s at these championships.

Dobre was also a member of the silver-medal-winning Romanian teams at the 1988 Summer Olympics and the 1989 World Artistic Gymnastics Championships. However, her career was cut short because of two major injuries and a growth spurt.

For years, Dobre was thought to be the youngest world all-around champion ever, having won her title at the age of 14 years and 352 days, until it was found that Olga Bicherova's age had been falsified at the 1981 World Championships, and that Bicherova had been 13 when she won her title.

Post-retirement 
She received an award at the Romanian Gymnastics Federation's 100-year anniversary celebration and was formally recognised as one of the Romanian gymnasts to have scored a perfect 10. In May 2016, she was inducted into the International Gymnastics Hall of Fame.

In 1991, Dobre moved to the United States and in 1992 married Iranian gymnastics coach Boz Mofid. They have four sons who are YouTube personalities: Cyrus, Darius, and twins Lucas and Marcus. Dobre is a choreographer and dance coach at the Dobre Gymnastics Academy in Maryland.

References

External links

List of competitive results at Gymn Forum

1972 births
Living people
Gymnasts from Bucharest
Romanian female artistic gymnasts
Romanian emigrants to the United States
Naturalized citizens of the United States
Olympic gymnasts of Romania
Olympic silver medalists for Romania
Olympic medalists in gymnastics
Gymnasts at the 1988 Summer Olympics
World champion gymnasts
Medalists at the World Artistic Gymnastics Championships
Medalists at the 1988 Summer Olympics